Nikos Moutsinas (born 6 September 1977) is a Greek television host and actor.

Career
He studied acting at Vasilis Diamantopoulos' IASMOS school in Thessaloniki. He has also attended dance classes at the school of Diana Theodoridou and has graduated from the State I.E.K. of Thessaloniki and the Theatrical Workshop "Thespis".

When he went to Athens, he became better known to the public through his participation in the show Kous Kous to mesimeri on Alpha TV in 2005-2007 and in 2006 he presented together with Natalia Germanou the game show Soundmix Show. In 2008 he participated in the morning show Omorfos Kosmos to proi with Grigoris Arnaoutoglou and Sissi Christidou. The following year, in 2009, he co-presented with Katerina Zarifi on ANT1's Proinos Kafes, a collaboration that failed after the channel terminated their collaboration mid-season. The following year he returned to Alpha TV where he collaborated with Eleni Menegaki in the 2009-2010 season on her show Kafes me tin Eleni.

In the period 2009-2014 he was the main presenter together with Maria Iliaki in the TV show Deste tous!. From 2014 to 2016 he was on ANT1 as he starred in the TV show Trixes, while he co-starred with Maria Bekatorou in Proino SouKou and in 2016 he returned again to Alpha TV through the show Xanadeste tous! which was cut on 24 February 2017.

In the 2017-2018 season he starred in ANT1's comedy series Kati Xorismena Palikaria, while in February 2018 he co-starred on the same channel with Zeta Makripoulia in the evening show Sunday Live which lasted four episodes. At the end of the same year, he returned to television through the newly established channel Open TV, presenting the midday show Gia tin Parea (his biggest success on television after Deste tous!) which premiered on 25 October 2018 (almost a day after the replacement of Epsilon TV in Open Beyond which started its first shows). From 23 September 2019, he presents a remake of the show on Skai TV under the name Kalo Mesimeraki, but with the same team. In March 2022, Moutsinas was announced as a judge for the Greek version of the music game show, The Masked Singer, which will begin airing on Skai TV on 31 March 2022.

Apart from being a presenter, he is also an actor with many successful theatrical performances to his credit such as Sesouar gia Dolofonous, Oi Apelpismeni, Psekasa tin Eliza, Ta Vaftisia, KTEL, Ververitsa, Oi apo Pano etc.

Finally, he has made cameo appearances in the Mega Channel series Maria, i Aschimi, To Kokkino Domatio, Singles 3 and Latremenoi Mou Geitones.

Filmography

Television

Film

Theatrography

References

External links 

1977 births
Living people
People from Thessaloniki
Greek television presenters
Greek male television actors
Greek male film actors
Greek male stage actors
Greek comedians